The 2006 Kadima interim leadership election was held 16 January 2006 to elect the interim leader of the Kadima party. The election took place roughly two weeks after party leader and prime minister of Israel Ariel Sharon was incapacitated after suffering a stroke. It saw Acting Prime Minister Ehud Olmert selected as interim party leader, positioning him to lead the party in the 2006 Israeli legislative election on 28 March 2006.

References

Kadima interim leadership
2006 interim
Kadima interim
Kadima interim leadership election
Ehud Olmert